Stephen J. Clark  (born November 7, 1960) is a politician in Ontario, Canada. He is the Minister of Municipal Affairs and Housing and a Progressive Conservative member of the Legislative Assembly of Ontario. He represents the riding of Leeds—Grenville—Thousand Islands and Rideau Lakes and has served as an MPP since 2010. Clark served as Opposition House Leader from 2014-2015; Co-Deputy Leader, Official Opposition with Sylvia Jones from 2015-2018; and Deputy Opposition House Leader from 2012-2014 and 2017-2018.

Biography
Clark was born in Brockville, Ontario, on November 7, 1960. He lives in Brockville with his wife Deanna.

Clark served three terms as mayor of Brockville from 1982 to 1991. First elected at age 22, he was the youngest mayor in Canada at the time. He was also president of the Association of Municipalities of Ontario. He later worked as an advertising salesman for the Brockville Recorder and Times, as an administrative assistant to Bob Runciman, and as the chief administrative officer for the township of Leeds and the Thousand Islands.

He was first elected as the MPP for Leeds–Grenville in a by-election on March 4, 2010 held to replace Bob Runciman who resigned to accept a position in the Canadian Senate. He was easily re-elected in 2011 and in 2014 both with large pluralities. In 2018, he was elected as the MPP for the riding of Leeds–Grenville–Thousands Islands and Rideau Lakes. In 2018, he was appointed as the Minister of Municipal Affairs and Housing by Premier Doug Ford.

In September 2018, as Municipal Affairs Minister, he introduced the Better Local Government Act (Bill 5) to align the City of Toronto's municipal ward boundaries with provincial and federal electoral districts. This legislation intended to reduce the size of Toronto city council to create a more efficient council. When this legislation was initially ruled unconstitutional, he supported the unprecedented step of invoking the notwithstanding clause. Ultimately, The Ontario court of appeal accepted Ontario's position that the Better Local Government Act, 2018 did not infringe the Charter s. 2(b) freedom of expression rights of either municipal voters or candidates.

In January 2019, Clark proposed changes to the Greater Golden Horseshoe Growth Plan. The changes put an emphasis on transit-oriented development while allowing municipalities and developers to work together to build communities that address local needs and regional priorities, while maintaining protections for the Greenbelt, agricultural lands, the agri-food sector, and natural heritage systems. 

Clark introduced the Municipal Modernization Program in March 2019 to improve local service delivery and efficiency in 405 small and rural municipalities in Ontario. He also developed the Audit and Accountability Fund to help the larger 39 municipalities and three school boards to conduct independent, financial reviews. To bolster municipal modernization efforts, Clark announced additional funding for municipalities in March 2020 to find ways to lower costs and improve services for residents and businesses as well as streamline development processes to increase the supply of housing. 

On May 2, 2019, Clark introduced Ontario’s Housing Supply Action Plan and the More Homes, More Choice Act (Bill 108), to make it easier and faster to build housing of all types, and to reduce the cost of renting or buying a home in Ontario. The Bill followed extensive consultations with a broad range of stakeholders in industry, the non-profit sector and members of the public. In addition to legislative changes, the Housing Supply Action Plan supported innovative ways to increase housing supply through a series of practical and informative guides on second suites, co-ownership, life leases and tiny homes. 

In July 2020, during the COVID-19 pandemic, Clark announced alongside Premier Doug Ford the historic one-time emergency $4 billion Safe Restart Agreement with the federal government. As a result of the COVID-19 outbreak, municipalities experienced unprecedented cashflow and financial pressures from decreased revenues and increased service delivery costs. The Safe Restart Agreement funding will flow directly to municipalities to help them deal with COVID-19 related pressures, maintain critical services and protect vulnerable people as the province safely and gradually re-opened. 

During the COVID-19 pandemic, Clark worked closely with municipal partners across Ontario and introduced the COVID-19 Economic Recovery Act (Bill 197), which received Royal Assent on July 21, 2020.

Electoral record

Cabinet posts

References

External links
 
 

1960 births
Living people
Members of the Executive Council of Ontario
Progressive Conservative Party of Ontario MPPs
Mayors of Brockville
Canadian city managers and chief administrative officers
21st-century Canadian politicians